John Rowland Fothergill (1876–1957) was an English innkeeper and entrepreneur, described as a "pioneer amateur innkeeper" in Who's Who.

Biography
John Rowland Fothergill was born in Kent in 1876, his family originating from Westmorland and Caerleon. He studied at St John's College, Oxford, the Slade School of Fine Art and the London School of Architecture. His contemporaries at the Slade included Augustus John and William Rothenstein.

In 1898, Fothergill and Rothenstein opened the Carfax Gallery on 24 Bury Street, St James's with managerial assistance from Arthur Clifton and Robert Sickert (brother of Walter Sickert) and financial support from Edward Perry Warren. The gallery became Walter Sickert's chief dealer in England. William Bruce Ellis Ranken held his first exhibition at the gallery. Fothergill subsequently became one of Warren's biographers.

Fothergill bought a large Tudor oak table for £25 that was installed in the dining room at Warren's home, Lewes House. Upon Warren's death, it sold for £2,100 (£ in ). Fothergill was left £20,000 (£ in ) by Warren. His book, Confessions of an Innkeeper was dedicated to Warren's partner and main beneficiary.

In 1922, Fothergill bought the Spread Eagle Hotel in Thame and turned it into a success through the decade before it closed in 1931. The pub was regularly visited by Evelyn Waugh and associates, and is mentioned in Brideshead Revisited. Waugh gave Fothergill a copy of his first novel, Decline and Fall, in which he wrote, "John Fothergill, Oxford's only civilizing influence." Fothergill hid the copy in the inn's toilet to avoid theft. Harold Acton also visited the inn and namechecked Fothergill in his memoirs, Memoirs of an Aesthete. Fothergill praised Acton's novel, Humdrum, saying that it "might have been written by the young Wilde." Fothergill's book, My Three Inns recommends Acton's autobiography at the end.

Following the Spread Eagle, Fothergill managed the Royal Ascot Hotel and the Three Swans at Market Harborough. He gravitated around the Bright Young Things group, in the meaning that this crowd attended the venues managed by Fothergill. He was praised for his cooking and innkeeping skills that helped to improve overall dining standards in Britain.

Fothergill was a close friend of Robbie Ross and Reginald Turner, and met Oscar Wilde aged 19. Wilde grew fond of him, and presented Fothergill with an inscribed copy of The Ballad of Reading Gaol, following Wilde's release from prison in 1897.

Publications
 An Innkeeper's Diary (1931)
 Confessions of an Innkeeper (1938) 
 My Three Inns (1949)

John Fothergills Cookery Book (1943)

References

1876 births
1957 deaths
English writers